Final Power Hall in Tokyo Dome was a professional wrestling event produced by New Japan Pro-Wrestling (NJPW). It took place on January 4, 1998 in the Tokyo Dome. Final Power Hall in Tokyo Dome was the seventh January 4 Tokyo Dome Show held by NJPW. The show drew 55,000 spectators and $6,000,000 in ticket sales. One of the focal points of the show was the retirement of wrestling legend Riki Choshu, who would wrestle five times that night against select opponents in what was billed as the Riki Road Final Message 5, the completion of 
a months-long "retirement tour" for Choshu. The show also featured successful defenses of the IWGP Junior Heavyweight Championship and the IWGP Heavyweight Championship, which made Final Power Hall in Tokyo Dome the first January 4 Tokyo Dome show to not have a single championship change hands. Besides the five Riki Road Final Message 5 matches the show featured eight additional matches.

Production

Background
The January 4 Tokyo Dome Show is NJPW's biggest annual event and has been called "the largest professional wrestling show in the world outside of the United States" and the "Japanese equivalent to the Super Bowl".

Storylines
Final Power Hall in Tokyo Dome featured professional wrestling matches that involved different wrestlers from pre-existing scripted feuds and storylines. Wrestlers portrayed villains, heroes, or less distinguishable characters in scripted events that built tension and culminated in a wrestling match or series of matches.

Results

References

External links
NJPW.co.jp 

1998 in professional wrestling
1998 in Tokyo
January 1998 events in Asia
1998